Kaʻōhelelani or Kaohele was a Hawaiian chiefess in the early Kingdom of Hawaii.

Life
She was born in the District of Hāna on the island of Maui in the mid to late 18th century. Her mother was High Chiefess Kaloiokalani of the royal family of Kahikinui and Honuaula (southern Maui). Her father was Kalokuokamaile, older half-brother of Kamehameha I who later unified the Hawaiian Islands in to found the Kingdom of Hawaii; both were sons of Keōua Kalanikupuapaikalaninui.
Her father was the High Chief of Hāna, Kipahulu and Kaupo.

Her parents named her Kaʻōhelelani, and she was their only child. She was verging into maidenhood when her father died.  His people showed their affection for him by making his grave on the highest peak of their country, Kauwiki. Upon news of his death reaching his brother Kamehameha, he immediately assembled a retinue of followers and retainers to accompany his brother Kealiimaikai to bear his request to Kaloiokalani to permit her daughter Kaʻōhelelani to take up her residence at his court, and to have his brother take charge of the vast patrimonial estate until Kaʻōhelelani should reach her majority.

As Kaʻōhelelani approached maturity Kamehameha was looking for a matrimonial alliance for his niece.  As the Waimea people, under the rule of their high chief Hinai, had shown reluctance to submit to him, Kamehameha united the ruling families through an offer of the hand of his niece to Nuhi, the eldest son of Hinau. This offer was accepted and soon Kaohele was transported to her new home in Waimea.

Kamehameha was sorely disappointed in his expectations. Kaʻōhelelani became attached to her new home and family, but the anticipated peace between the two families was not realized. Possibly she felt resentment toward Kamehameha, since after he conquered Maui king Kalanikupule, he gave her former land to the chiefs who aided him.

Nuhi and Kaʻōhelelani had a daughter Kekaikuihala and then a son Gideon Peleioholani Laanui.

Family tree

References

External links
 

Royalty of the Hawaiian Kingdom
House of Kalokuokamaile
Year of birth missing
Year of death missing